Justice Harlan may refer to one of three Associate Justices of the United States Supreme Court:
John Marshall Harlan (1833–1911) 
John Marshall Harlan II (1899–1971)
Harlan F. Stone (1872–1946), though he is more correctly referred to by last name as Justice Stone